The Collective is a group of mountain bikers, filmmakers and photographers that shoot films, ride bikes and take photographs. In 2004, The Collective, released a self-titled film, The Collective. The film won awards. Since then they have released a second film, Roam, and a third film, Seasons.

The Collective is based in Whistler and Vancouver, British Columbia.

Movies 
The Collective - 2004
Roam - April 2006
Seasons - April 2008

Locations 
The movies were filmed in 8 major locations including; The Vancouver North Shore Rainforest; Moab, Utah; Whistler Bike Park, British Columbia; Prague, Czech Republic; Sun Valley, Idaho; Parksville, British Columbia; the Atlas Mountains, Morocco; Les Gets, France; and the Interior regions of British Columbia, namely Kamloops. The film took approximately ten months to film.

Riders 
High-profile riders including Darren Berrecloth, Geoff Gulevich, Wade Simmons, Tyler Morland, Nathan Rennie, Ryan Leech, Steve Romaniuk, Adam Billinghurst, Sam Hill, Kenny Smith, Steve Peat, Stevie Smith, Andrew Shandro, Ryder Kasprick, Jordie Lunn, Cam McCaul, Matt Hunter, Cameron DeClerk, Thomas Vanderham, Gee Atherton, Ben Boyko, Brendan Fairclough, Kurt Sorge, Brandon Semenuk.

Soundtrack

References

External links 
Official Website
Review of Roam by bikemag.com

Mountain biking in the United States
Mountain biking teams and clubs
Mountain biking films
Canadian mountain bikers
Mountain bike innovators
Mountain biking journalists